Betty J. Turock is an American librarian and educator who served as president of the American Library Association from 1995 to 1996. She was a member of the faculty of the Rutgers School of Communication and Information for 22 years. Turock is best known for her advocacy for equity of access to electronic information via the Internet as well as for championing diversity in the library profession.

Early life and education
Betty J. Turock was born in Scranton, Pennsylvania on June 12, 1936.

Turock graduated from Keystone Junior College in 1953 and received her bachelor’s degree from Syracuse University in 1955. She earned her Master of Library Science degree in 1970 and a Ph.D. in Library and Information Science in 1981 from Rutgers University.

Career

Early in her career Dr. Turock was head librarian for the East Winston and Kernersville branches of the Forsyth County system headquartered in Winston Salem, North Carolina. where she enlisted members of the Black Panthers to bring people into the recently desegregated library. She held a number of managerial positions in school, public and academic libraries, including serving as Director of the Montclair Public Library, where she worked to "make the library an activist community center" and as Assistant Director of the Rochester and Monroe County Library System. She was appointed to serve as a senior advisor in the U.S. Department of Education's Office of Educational Research and Improvement. Turock shifted from library administration to educating future librarians in 1980 when upon completing her Ph.D. she was invited to join the faculty of the Department of Library and Information Science in the newly formed Rutgers School of Communication, Information and Library Science. She served as the department chair from 1989 to 1995 and again from 2001 to 2002; from 2002 to 2003 she was the Associate Dean of the School.

She has authored over 100 reports and publications, and was the founding editor of The Bottom Line, a journal dedicated to the study of library finances. Some of her books include Evaluating Federally Funded Library Programs (1990), Serving the Older Adult: A Guide to Library Programs and Information Sources (1992), and Envisioning a Nation Connected: Librarians Define the Public Interest in the Information Superhighway (1996). Turock has also lectured and worked as a consultant in the United States, Russia, India, China, Taiwan, and the U.S. Virgin Islands.

ALA presidency
After serving in multiple leadership positions within the American Library Association, Turock was elected president of ALA, serving from 1995 to 1996. As president she focused national attention on the digital divide and promoted libraries as the publicly funded point of equalization in access to information. During her presidency she testified before Congress and the Federal Communications Commission to advocate for just and equitable access to electronic information. James H. Billington, then Librarian of Congress, referred to her as “the Paul Revere of the Information Age." A prominent goal of Turock's presidency was recruiting and funding the education of at least fifty students from racial and ethnic minority populations each year. Her efforts, along with those of then-ALA Executive Director Elizabeth Martinez, resulted in the formation of ALA's Spectrum Scholarship Program, which continues to support members of underrepresented groups in attending library and information science programs.

Awards and honors
In 2017, Keystone College renamed their School of Arts and Sciences to the Turock School of Arts and Sciences in honor of Betty Turock and her son David L. Turock to recognize their decades of support. The family received Keystone’s Presidential Medallion in 2000.

Turock has received numerous awards, including the American Library Association's highest honor, honorary membership, conferred for contribution to librarianship that it is so outstanding that it is of lasting importance to the advancement of the whole field of library service. In 2000, ALA honored her as one of the Extraordinary Library Advocates of the Twentieth Century. Other honors received include:

References

Living people
American librarians
American women librarians
Presidents of the American Library Association
Keystone College alumni
Syracuse University alumni
Rutgers University alumni
1936 births
21st-century American women